Beau Waters (born 30 March 1986) is a former professional Australian rules footballer and vice-captain of the West Coast Eagles in the Australian Football League (AFL). Originally from the Happy Valley Football Club, South Australia, he played for the West Adelaide Football Club in the South Australian National Football League (SANFL) before being recruited to West Coast with the 11th pick overall in the 2003 National Draft. Waters made his senior debut in 2004, and has played a total of 120 games for the club, mainly as a defender, including the 2006 premiership. He was also in the All-Australian team in 2012, on a half-back flank. Waters' career has been plagued by injury.

Early life
Waters grew up in Happy Valley, South Australia, playing for the Happy Valley Football Club in the Southern Football League. He was a member of the 2002 AIS/AFL program intake. He made his senior debut in the SANFL for West Adelaide at the age of 17 in 2003, and was also named in the 2003 Under-18 All-Australian team.

AFL career
Waters was recruited as the Eagles' first-round draft pick in the 2003 National Draft with pick 11. Eagles recruiting manager Trevor Woodhouse described him as ready to immediately step into the Eagles' team: "Beau Waters, we rate him pretty high, he's a skilled left-footer. We're looking for him to step into the fore reasonably quickly, but there's no pressure on him to play next year."

He made his debut for the Eagles against  at the Telstra Dome in Round 3 of the 2004 AFL season, gathering ten possessions and four marks in a game the Eagles lost by six points.

Waters did not play a game in the 2005 season after being ruled out with osteitis pubis. A week after he had recovered from the injury, he was hit by a taxi he was trying to flag down after a night out in Subiaco. Rushed to Sir Charles Gairdner Hospital, it was initially thought no damage had been done, but it was later revealed he had injured his lateral ligament, ruling him out for six weeks during the pre-season.

Waters returned to the side in 2006 as a key part of the squad, playing 23 matches throughout the season. He scored his first AFL goal in Round 3 against Richmond. He gained his first Brownlow votes in Round 18 against St Kilda for a 34-possession game. Waters played in every one of the Eagles' finals matches.

Waters played 20 games in 2007 and eight games in 2008 before suffering a season-ending elbow injury. He resumed full-training in May of 2009 but then re-injured the same elbow, ruling him out for the remainder of the 2009 season. Waters was awarded the Chris Mainwaring Award for Best Clubman in 2009 for his work for the club while off injured.

Waters made a long-awaited return in the 2010 season, after one-and-a-half years out due to injury. He was one of the Eagles best players in a year where the club finished last, averaging 21 possessions and seven marks in a 20-game season. Waters also captained the club for a number of games after regular captain Darren Glass was ruled out for the season with a knee injury. Waters gathered two Brownlow votes for a 33-possession game in a loss against  in Round 11, and finished third overall in the West Coast Eagles Best & Fairest.

Waters was named the Eagles sole vice-captain for the 2011 AFL season.

He retired in February 2015 due to ongoing injury.

On 19 October 2020 he was awarded life membership of the West Coast Eagles

Community work
In 2014, Waters won the Jim Stynes Community Leadership Award for his work for the Cancer Council Western Australia.

Statistics

|- style="background-color: #EAEAEA"
! scope="row" style="text-align:center" | 2004
|style="text-align:center;"|West Coast
| 22 || 10 || 0 || 3 || 81 || 57 || 138 || 46 || 17 || 0.0 || 0.3 || 8.1 || 5.7 || 13.8 || 4.6 || 1.7
|-
! scope="row" style="text-align:center" | 2005
|style="text-align:center;"|West Coast
| 8 || 0 || — || — || — || — || — || — || — || — || — || — || — || — || — || —
|- style="background:#eaeaea;"
! scope="row" style="text-align:center" | 2006
|style="text-align:center;"|West Coast
| 8 || 23 || 8 || 8 || 213 || 177 || 390 || 120 || 58 || 0.3 || 0.3 || 9.3 || 7.7 || 17.0 || 5.2 || 2.5
|-
! scope="row" style="text-align:center" | 2007
|style="text-align:center;"|West Coast
| 8 || 20 || 1 || 0 || 207 || 206 || 413 || 131 || 50 || 0.1 || 0.0 || 10.4 || 10.3 || 20.7 || 6.6 || 2.5
|- style="background:#eaeaea;"
! scope="row" style="text-align:center" | 2008
|style="text-align:center;"|West Coast
| 8 || 8 || 4 || 1 || 86 || 44 || 130 || 36 || 24 || 0.5 || 0.1 || 10.8 || 5.5 || 16.3 || 4.5 || 3.0
|-
! scope="row" style="text-align:center" | 2009
|style="text-align:center;"|West Coast
| 8 || 0 || — || — || — || — || — || — || — || — || — || — || — || — || — || —
|- style="background:#eaeaea;"
! scope="row" style="text-align:center" | 2010
|style="text-align:center;"|West Coast
| 8 || 21 || 4 || 5 || 259 || 182 || 441 || 146 || 69 || 0.2 || 0.2 || 12.3 || 8.7 || 21.0 || 7.0 || 3.3
|- 
! scope="row" style="text-align:center" | 2011
|style="text-align:center;"|West Coast
| 8 || 11 || 0 || 0 || 129 || 69 || 198 || 53 || 34 || 0.0 || 0.0 || 11.7 || 6.3 || 18.0 || 4.8 || 3.1
|- style="background:#eaeaea;"
! scope="row" style="text-align:center" | 2012
|style="text-align:center;"|West Coast
| 8 || 20 || 8 || 4 || 279 || 143 || 422 || 146 || 48 || 0.4 || 0.2 || 14.0 || 7.2 || 21.1 || 7.3 || 2.4
|- 
! scope="row" style="text-align:center" | 2013
|style="text-align:center;"|West Coast
| 8 || 7 || 0 || 0 || 104 || 39 || 143 || 50 || 19 || 0.0 || 0.0 || 14.9 || 5.6 || 20.4 || 7.1 || 2.7
|- style="background:#eaeaea;"
! scope="row" style="text-align:center" | 2014
|style="text-align:center;"|West Coast
| 8 || 0 || — || — || — || — || — || — || — || — || — || — || — || — || — || —
|- 
! scope="row" style="text-align:center" | 2015
|style="text-align:center;"|West Coast
| 8 || 0 || — || — || — || — || — || — || — || — || — || — || — || — || — || —
|- class="sortbottom"
! colspan=3| Career
! 120
! 25
! 21
! 1358
! 917
! 2275
! 728
! 319
! 0.2
! 0.2
! 11.3
! 7.6
! 19.0
! 6.1
! 2.7
|}

References

External links

1986 births
Living people
All-Australians (AFL)
Australian rules footballers from South Australia
Claremont Football Club players
West Coast Eagles players
West Coast Eagles Premiership players
West Adelaide Football Club players
Happy Valley Football Club players
One-time VFL/AFL Premiership players